Oliva pacifica is a species of sea snail, a marine gastropod mollusk in the family Olividae, the olives.

Description

Its shell is long and roughly cylindrical in shape and is 30–63 mm long, with a narrow slit running along the length of it.

Distribution

Oliva pacifica is mainly found in western Thailand.

References

pacifica
Gastropods described in 1870